Paband (also Romanized as Pāband; also known as Pāsand) is a village in Shohada Rural District, Yaneh Sar District, Behshahr County, Mazandaran Province, Iran. At the 2006 census, its population was 360, in 146 families.

References 

Populated places in Behshahr County